Dawson is a city in Kidder County, North Dakota, United States. The population was 74 at the 2020 census.

History
Dawson was laid out in 1882 by J. Dawson Thompson, and named for him. A post office has been in operation at Dawson since 1881.

Geography
Dawson is located at  (46.867102, -99.752439).

Demographics

Dawson has a veteran's memorial wall to honor soldiers in foreign wars.

2010 census
As of the census of 2010, there were 61 people, 30 households, and 16 families residing in the city. The racial makeup of the city was 100.0% White. Hispanic or Latino of any race were 8.2% of the population.

There were 30 households, of which 20.0% had children under the age of 18 living with them, 40.0% were married couples living together, 6.7% had a female householder with no husband present, 6.7% had a male householder with no wife present, and 46.7% were non-families. 46.7% of all households were made up of individuals, and 16.6% had someone living alone who was 65 years of age or older. The average household size was 2.03 and the average family size was 2.75.

The median age in the city was 52.5 years. 21.3% of residents were under the age of 18; 6.6% were between the ages of 18 and 24; 16.4% were from 25 to 44; 32.8% were from 45 to 64; and 23% were 65 years of age or older. The gender makeup of the city was 57.4% male and 42.6% female.

2000 census
As of the census of 2000, there were 75 people, 38 households, and 16 families residing in the city. The population density was 186.9 people per square mile (72.4/km2). There were 52 housing units at an average density of 129.6 per square mile (50.2/km2). The racial makeup of the city was 100.00% White.

There were 38 households, out of which 18.4% had children under the age of 18 living with them, 31.6% were married couples living together, 2.6% had a female householder with no husband present, and 55.3% were non-families. 52.6% of all households were made up of individuals, and 36.8% had someone living alone who was 65 years of age or older. The average household size was 1.97 and the average family size was 3.00.

In the city, the population was spread out, with 20.0% under the age of 18, 9.3% from 18 to 24, 14.7% from 25 to 44, 25.3% from 45 to 64, and 30.7% who were 65 years of age or older. The median age was 49 years. For every 100 females, there were 127.3 males. For every 100 females age 18 and over, there were 93.5 males.

The median income for a household in the city was $20,833, and the median income for a family was $22,917. Males had a median income of $23,750 versus $0 for females. The per capita income for the city was $13,192. There were no families and 20.3% of the population living below the poverty line, including no under eighteens and 23.3% of those over 64.

See also
 Harker Lake
 Upper Harker Lake

External links
Dawson centennial 1880-1980 : Dawson, North Dakota : the first 100 years from the Digital Horizons website

References

Cities in North Dakota
Cities in Kidder County, North Dakota
Populated places established in 1880
1880 establishments in Dakota Territory